This article contains a list of fossil-bearing stratigraphic units in the state of Illinois, U.S.

Sites

See also

 Paleontology in Illinois

References

 

Illinois
Stratigraphic units
Stratigraphy of Illinois
Illinois geography-related lists
United States geology-related lists